Vickram Kanth (born 11 April 1987) is an Indian field hockey player who plays as a defender. He was part of the Indian team that won gold at the 2007 Men's Hockey Asia Cup, as well as the teams that won bronze at the 2007 Sultan Azlan Shah Cup and silver at the 2008 Sultan Azlan Shah Cup.

References

1987 births
Living people
People from Kodagu district
Indian male field hockey players
Field hockey players from Karnataka